In the state of Tamil Nadu the most widely professed religion is Hinduism, with significant Christian and Muslim communities. Tamil Nadu has centers of worship for a multitude of faiths. According to 2011 Census of India figures, 87.6% of Tamil Nadu's population are Hindus, 6.12% are Christians, 5.86% are Muslims, 0.12% are Jains, 0.02% are Buddhists and 0.02% are Sikhs.

Hinduism 

Hinduism is the largest religion of Tamil Nadu. The total number of Hindus in Tamil Nadu as per 2011 Indian census is 63,188,168 which forms 89% of the total population of Tamil Nadu. The major worship forms of Shiva temples are for Shiva, Parvathi, Ganesha, and Muruga. Vishnu is either worshiped directly or in the form of his ten avatars, most famous of whom are Rama and Krishna.

Village deities or grama devata of village are also widely worshiped among the people of the villages. They are found in almost all villages throughout India, and more common in Tamil Nadu and Andhra Pradesh. They are known as Kaval Deivam (guardian deity) and Local Village Gods. They are associated to a main deity who is generally ascribed as Kuladeivam by various communities and castes as part of the tracing their generation through centuries.

The sixty-three Nayanars and the twelve Alvars are regarded as exponents of the bhakti tradition of Hinduism in South India as most of them came from the ancient Tamil region

The development of Hinduism grew up in the temples and mathas of medieval Tamil Nadu with self-conscious rejection of Jain practices.

Christianity 

Christianity is the second largest religion in the state. The total number of Christians in Tamil Nadu as per 2011 Indian census is 4,418,331 which forms 6.12% of the total population of Tamil Nadu. Christians are mainly concentrated in the southern districts of Tamil Nadu – Kanyakumari (46% of the population), Thoothukudi (16.68%) and Tirunelveli (10.59%).

Kanyakumari district which has about 46 percent Christian population is the district with largest Christian population.

According to Christian beliefs, St. Thomas, one of the twelve apostles, landed in Malabar Coast  in 52 CE, and built the St. Mary's Church in Thiruvithamcode, Kanyakumari district in 63 AD. During the colonial period a large number of Italian, British, Dutch and Portuguese Christians came to Tamil Nadu.

The Catholic Church and the Church of South India are the major denominations in the state, other denominations include the Evangelical Church of India, The Salvation Army, Syro-Malabar Catholic Church, the Syro-Malankara Catholic Church, the Malankara Orthodox Syrian Church, the Apostolics, the Pentecostal, the Jacobite Syrian Christian Church and other denominations.

Islam 

Islam is the third largest religion of Tamil Nadu accounting for around 5.86 percent of the population according to the 2011 census. The total number of Tamil Muslims according to the 2011 census is 4,229,479. An overwhelming majority of Tamil Muslims belong to the Sunni denomination although a small Shia minority does exist.

Jainism 

The total number of Jains in Tamil Nadu as per 2011 Indian census is 89,265 which forms 0.12% of the total population of Tamil Nadu, including both Tamil Jains and Jains originating from North India that settled in Tamil Nadu. Tamil Jains are predominantly scattered in northern Tamil Nadu, largely in the districts of Kanchipuram, Madurai, Vellore, Thanjavur, Cuddalore, Viluppuram and Tiruvannamalai.

Some scholars believe that Jain philosophy entered South India in the sixth century BCE.The Tamil Jains are ancient natives of Tamil Nadu and belong to the Digambara sect. They generally use the title Nainar. The former North Arcot and South Arcot (now Tiruvannamalai, Vellore, Cuddalore and Villupuram Districts) districts have a large number of Jain temples, as well as a significant Jain population. Many of them retain some Jain customs such as vegetarianism.

Camaṇar wrote much Tamil literature, including the important Sangam literature, such as the Silappatikaram, the Manimekalai, the Nālaṭiyār and the Cīvaka Cintāmaṇi. Three of the five great epics of Tamil literature are written by Jains.

Buddhism 
The Buddhist philosophy and its growth in Tamil Nadu had great influence before the 12th century CE. The total number of Buddhists in Tamil Nadu as per 2011 Indian census is 11,186 which forms 0.02% of the total population of Tamil Nadu.

Sikhism 
The total number of Sikhs in Tamil Nadu as per 2011 Indian census is 14,601 which forms 0.02% of the total population of Tamil Nadu. Some Sikhs have migrated mainly to the southern districts of Tamil Nadu for agriculture and business purposes.

Demographics 
The following table shows the total number of people belonging to each religion in Tamil Nadu

See also 

 Religion in Chennai
 Christianity in Kanyakumari district

References

Sources 

 
 

 
Religion in India by state or union territory
Tamil history
History of religion in India
Tamils and religion
Ancient Tamil Nadu